Hechanova is a surname. Notable people with the surname include:

Cecil Hechanova (1932/1933–2016), chairman of the Philippine Sports Commission
Rafael Hechanova (1928–2021), Filipino basketball player, brother of Cecil